Nieuwendam (literal translation: "new dam") is a neighbourhood of Amsterdam, Netherlands, best known for its marina (Dutch: jachthaven). A former village in the province of North Holland, Nieuwendam was a separate municipality until 1921, when it merged with Amsterdam, at the same time as Ransdorp. The municipality also covered the village of Zunderdorp. Nowadays, it is part of the Amsterdam-Noord borough.

References

External links

Former municipalities of North Holland
Amsterdam-Noord
Neighbourhoods of Amsterdam